Jim Fernandez's Kambal sa Uma (International Name: The Rat Sisters /) is a 2009 Philippine fantasy horror romantic drama television series directed by Manny Q. Palo and Rechie A. del Carmen. The series stars Melissa Ricks as Ella Perea and Venus dela Riva, and ABS-CBN's Kapamilya Gold Queen Shaina Magdayao as Vira Mae Ocampo and Marie Perea, together with leading men Matt Evans and Jason Abalos, with an ensemble cast consisting of Rio Locsin, Gina Alajar, Carl Guevara, Allan Paule, Lotlot de Leon, Aldred Gatchalian, Bangs Garcia, Bing Davao, Nonie Buencamino, Jordan Herrera, Eva Darren, and Carmi Martin in their supporting roles. The series premiered on ABS-CBN's Hapontastic afternoon block and worldwide on TFC from April 20 to October 9, 2009, replacing Parekoy and was replaced by Nagsimula sa Puso. Throughout its run, Kambal sa Uma was a top-rating afternoon drama television series.

Kambal sa Uma reunited love-team Melissa Ricks and Matt Evans together after the success of their previous show together, Iisa Pa Lamang, a Primetime Bida television series starring Claudine Barretto. Rio Locsin also stars in the remake portraying the role of Milagros Perea, but originally played Ella and Vira in the film version in 1979. This also marks Carmi Martin's return to ABS-CBN after 2 years of being with both GMA Network and TV5, while being her first team-up with Shaina Magdayao. They would once again reunite in 2017 in a melodrama television series The Better Half, with Carlo Aquino, JC de Vera, and Denise Laurel.

This series can be viewed on the Jeepney TV YouTube Channel.

Overview

Comics
Kambal sa Uma is a comics creation by Jim Fernandez and Ernie Santiago. Its tells a story of twin sisters who both have different characteristics of a rat. Ella, have adapted the characteristics of the rats facial appearance while Vira only managed to gain the hairs on her back.

1979 film
Kambal sa Uma has been adapted into a film in the 1970s directed by Joey Gosiengfiao. It starred Rio Locsin who played both Ella and Vira; Rio Locsin now portrays Ella and Vira's mother, Milagros in the TV remake. It also starred Al Tantay, Dennis Roldan, Orestes Ojeda, Julie Ann Fortich, and Isabel Rivas.

Plot
Based on the komiks creation of Jim Fernandez and Ernie Santiago and the 1970s film by Joey Gosiengfiao, Kambal Sa Uma tells the story of Ella (Melissa Ricks) and Vira (Shaina Magdayao), twin sisters who have some of the physical features of a rodent. When she was still a baby, Vira was given away by her mother Milagros (Rio Locsin) and ended up in the care of a rich couple in the city. Meanwhile, Ella remained with her mother and lived in the mountains away from persecution of people. Through a dramatic course of events, Ella and Vira will cross paths and their differences will lead to a bitter clash.

Cast and characters
Protagonist
Melissa Ricks as  Venus dela Riva / Ella Perea
Shaina Magdayao as Vira Mae Ocampo / Marie Perea

Lead cast
Matt Evans as Gabriel "Gab" Ledesma 
Jason Abalos as Dino San Jose

Main cast
Rio Locsin as Milagros Perea 
Gina Alajar as Celeste Miranda-Ledesma

Supporting cast
Lotlot de Leon as Lourdes Ledesma-Ocampo 
Allan Paule as Aurelio Ocampo 
Carmi Martin as Lolita dela Riva 
Carl Guevara as Benjie San Jose 
Bangs Garcia as Ynez Ocampo 
Aldred Gatchalian as Emil Ledesma

Extended cast
Nonie Buencamino as Raul Perea Sr.  
Bing Davao as Fernando "Fernan" Ledesma  
Eva Darren as Lola Salve 
Dianne Medina as Kat 
Nathalie Hart as Myka  
Sergio Garcia as Edward
Helga Krapf as Mary

Special participation
Paul Salas as young Dino San Jose
Mark Joshua Salvador as young Gabriel "Gab" Ledesma
Angel Sy as young Ella Perea
Nikki Bagaporo as young Ynez Ocampo
Mika dela Cruz as young Vira Mae Ocampo / Marie Perea 
Joross Gamboa as young Raul Perea Sr.
Dimples Romana as young Milagros Perea
Desiree del Valle as young Celeste Miranda-Ledesma
Cheska Billiones as young Lourdes Ocampo
Baron Geisler as young Aurelio Ocampo

Re-run
Served as a noontime program, Kambal sa Uma re-aired from May 26, 2014, to September 19, 2014, at 11:45 AM and re-aired again on March 25, 2019, at 2:55 PM on cable channel, Jeepney TV as part of the tagline block Pasada Pantasya.

See also
List of programs broadcast by ABS-CBN
List of ABS-CBN drama series

References

2009 Philippine television series debuts
2009 Philippine television series endings
ABS-CBN drama series
Filipino-language television shows
Live action television shows based on films
Television shows based on comics
Television series by Dreamscape Entertainment Television
Television shows set in the Philippines